The Franco-Visigothic Wars were a series of wars between the Franks and the Visigoths, but it also involved the Burgundians, the Ostrogoths and the Romans. The most noteworthy war of the conflict would be the Second Franco-Visigothic War that included the famous Battle of Vouillé and resulted in Frankish annexation of most of Southern France.

Background
In 486, Clovis I defeated the Gallo-Romans decisively, impelling the commander, Syagrius to flee to the court of Alaric II. Probably in 487, while Clovis was pillaging the land and besieging the cities that resisted (at least Verdun and Paris) he sent the King of the Visigoths an ultimatum: hand-over Syagrius or risk war. Therefore, instead of aiding the exile, Alaric—reluctant to combat the Franks—forfeited Syagrius, whom Clovis immediately executed.

First Franco-Visigothic war (492–496)

Frankish offensive
By 491, Clovis had stabilized the former Roman territory and was eager to move against Alaric. Hence soon, he laid a siege to Nantes; the most northern city under Visigothic rule. Nantes resisted sixty days. The Frankish commander, Chilo was impressed and thus converted to Catholicism. During this phase, Alaric seemingly refused to give Clovis battle, thus leaving Clovis to besiege Poitiers, Saintes, and Bordeaux. During the latter, an important Visigothic noble, Duke Suatrius of Bordeaux was captured. During his return from Bordeaux, Clovis might have captured Tours.

Visigothic counter-offensive
In 496, despite winning the Battle of Tolbiac against the Alemanni, the Franks took heavy casualties (and might have suffered from internal turmoil). Seeing the opportunity, Alaric quickly retook Bordeaux, Saintes, Poitiers, and Tours (if it had been taken). Therefore, rendering the war mostly null, even though Nantes was seemingly taken by the Armonici.

Burgundian civil war (500–501)

Frankish intervention
Godegisel, the brother of King Gundobad of the Burgundians seduced his brother-in-law, Clovis with the promise of annual tribute and territorial cessions to plot against Gundobad and in the year 500, the Franks entered the kingdom. Gundobad requested aid from his brother, and together the brothers marched against the invaders. The three armies met near Dijon, soon Gundobad found himself fighting the Franks and the forces of his brother and fled to the City of Avignon. Victorious, Godegisel retired to Vienne and assumed the kingship of the kingdom, but Clovis was not satisfied and marched to besiege Avignon. However, after a lengthy siege, a Roman magistrate of the city and a general, Aridius, convinced Clovis that the city could not be taken. Therefore, Clovis departed from the kingdom after parleying with Gundobad, who agreed to pay annual tribute.

Visigothic intervention
In 501, discontented, Gundobad allied himself with Alaric II, thus he stopped paying the annual tribute to Clovis and with Visigothic help besieged his brother in Vienne. When the city fell, Gundobad executed Godegisel and many of his Burgundian supporters, and thus re-established himself as the king of the Burgundians. For their efforts, Gundobad sent the Frankish captives to Alaric and gifted Avignon to Alaric II, who proceeded to meet up with Clovis. The two kings met near in the Village of Amboise, where Alaric agreed to release the captives, while Clovis returned all Visigothic territory he still held.

Second Franco-Visigothic war (507–508)

Road to Vouille
After allying the Armonici around 503 and gaining the approval of magnates of his realm, Clovis began the liberation of Aquitaine in 507. It's quite clear that this was intended to be a liberation and not an invasion, for Clovis forbade his men from pillaging the land. While marching from Nantes to Poitiers, Clovis' march was interrupted by Alaric II‒who was apparently aware of Clovis' support among the Catholics of his subjects and decided to defeat the Franks before they could join forces. This event is referred to as the Battle of Vouille, though little is known about this incident, only that the core of Visigothic army was destroyed and that Alaric II was killed (supposedly by Clovis in a single combat).

Eastern campaign
Clovis sent his son Theuderic to lead an independent campaign. The Frankish prince advanced from Clermont to Rodez, finally arriving in Albi. Meanwhile, Gundobad, assisted by the Franks, besieged Arles. However, after a lengthy siege, the Ostrogoths intervened and deflected a high loss, forcing the Burgundians to retreat.

Western campaign
Clovis was able to recapture Bordeaux before the end of 507 and spend the winter there. In the following year, Clovis was able to seize the enemy capital of Toulouse and the treasury with it. The Visigothic court had relocated Narbonne, hence Clovis aspired to take it as well, however, the city was protected by mountainous terrain, thus Clovis was forced to besiege Carcassonne, located between Toulouse and Narbonne. The siege, however, ended in failure, for Ostrogothic relief force was successful in driving the Franks off. The defeated Clovis turned back and took Angouleme, that he initially ignored. In order to nullify the chances of Ostrogoths recapturing any cities, Clovis installed extensive garrisons in the recently taken cities.

References 

Geopolitical rivalry
6th century in Francia
490s
500s